Sesame Workshop, formerly Children's Television Workshop (CTW), is an American nonprofit television production company. It has been involved in a variety of television series and films, in addition to international co-productions of Sesame Street that have been broadcast in over 140 countries.

Productions

Television series

Sesame Street
The following series are based on or directly related to Sesame Street. Dubs of the original American version have been produced for international markets since 1971, but are not listed. Programs with guest appearances by Sesame Street characters that were not produced by Sesame Workshop, such as The Muppet Show and Between the Lions, are also excluded.

Other television series

Theatrical feature films

TV films, specials, and documentaries

Sesame Street (1969–present)

Sesame Street Muppets have appeared in cameos in various feature films, including The Muppet Movie (1979), The Great Muppet Caper (1981), The Muppets Take Manhattan (1984), and Night at the Museum: Battle of the Smithsonian (2009). These productions, however, were not produced by Sesame Workshop. Also excluded from this list are Julie on Sesame Street (1973) and A Special Sesame Street Christmas (1978)—while both featured the same elements and characters of Sesame Street, these specials were not produced by Sesame Workshop.

Other TV films, and documentaries

Notes

References

Productions, List of Sesame Workshop
Sesame Workshop productions, List of
Sesame Workshop productions, List of